Mahdi Abdul-Sahib  (born 28 July 1956) is an Iraqi former footballer who played as a forward. He represented the Iraq national team at the 1978 Asian Games and 1982 Asian Games.

Mahdi played for Iraq between 1978 and 1981.

Career statistics
Scores and results list Iraq's goal tally first, score column indicates score after each Abdul-Sahib goal.

References

Living people
1956 births
Iraqi footballers
Association football forwards
Iraq international footballers
Footballers at the 1978 Asian Games
Footballers at the 1982 Asian Games
Asian Games competitors for Iraq